Serhiy Larin (born 11 January 1962, Khartsyzk) is a Ukrainian politician and electrical engineer.

Larin has been (except between April 2010 and November 2014) a member of the Ukrainian parliament since the 1998 Ukrainian parliamentary election for the People's Democratic Party, For United Ukraine! (2002 election), Party of Regions (2006 and 2007 election) and in the 2014 Ukrainian parliamentary election for the Opposition Bloc and in the 2019 Ukrainian parliamentary election for Opposition Platform — For Life. In April 2010 President Viktor Yanukovych appointed Larin Governor of Kirovohrad Oblast. Larin was appointed Deputy Head of Yanukovych's Presidential Administration of Ukraine on 9 January 2013 (the administration was led by Serhiy Lyovochkin). On 26 February 2014 a decree of acting President Oleksandr Turchynov dismissed Larin as Deputy Head of the Presidential Administration. On 21 April 2022 Larin joined the Platform for Life and Peace parliamentary group consisting of mostly former Opposition Platform — For Life deputies.

References

External links
 
 Serhiy Larin at the Official Ukraine Today portal

1962 births
Living people
People from Khartsyzk
Governors of Kirovohrad Oblast
People's Democratic Party (Ukraine) politicians
Party of Regions politicians
Opposition Bloc politicians
Opposition Platform — For Life politicians
Ninth convocation members of the Verkhovna Rada
Eighth convocation members of the Verkhovna Rada
Sixth convocation members of the Verkhovna Rada
Fifth convocation members of the Verkhovna Rada
Fourth convocation members of the Verkhovna Rada
Third convocation members of the Verkhovna Rada